Walter Ablinger (born 12 May 1969) is an Austrian Para-cyclist who represented Austria at the Paralympic Games.

Career
Ablinger represented Austria at the 2012 Summer Paralympics winning a gold medal in the men's road race H2 event and a silver medal in the men's road time trial H2 event. He then won a silver medal in the men's road time trial H3 event at the 2016 Summer Paralympics. Ablinger won a gold medal in the men's road time trial H3 event at the 2020 Summer Paralympics.

References

Living people
1969 births
Austrian male cyclists
Cyclists at the 2012 Summer Paralympics
Cyclists at the 2016 Summer Paralympics
Cyclists at the 2020 Summer Paralympics
Medalists at the 2012 Summer Paralympics
Medalists at the 2016 Summer Paralympics
Medalists at the 2020 Summer Paralympics
Paralympic medalists in cycling
Paralympic gold medalists for Austria
Paralympic silver medalists for Austria
People from Schärding District
Sportspeople from Upper Austria